The 2004–05 Slovenian Football Cup was the 14th season of the Slovenian Football Cup, Slovenia's football knockout competition. The tournament system was changed for this season. 20 lower league teams played in the first round, two last placed Slovenian PrvaLiga teams joined in the second and the rest in the Round of 16. The final was held as a single-legged match.

Qualified clubs

2003–04 Slovenian PrvaLiga members
Celje
Domžale
Drava Ptuj
Dravograd
Gorica
Koper
Ljubljana
Maribor
Mura
Olimpija
Primorje
Šmartno

Qualified through MNZ Regional Cups
MNZ Ljubljana:  Svoboda, Factor, Krka
MNZ Maribor: Železničar Maribor, Duplek, Paloma
MNZ Celje: Rudar Velenje, Krško
MNZ Koper: Portorož Piran, Izola
MNZ Nova Gorica: Tolmin, Brda
MNZ Murska Sobota: Veržej, Tišina
MNZ Lendava: Nafta Lendava, Hotiza
MNZG-Kranj: Triglav Kranj, Jesenice
MNZ Ptuj: Aluminij, Zavrč

First round

|}

Second round

|}

Round of 16

|}

Quarter-finals

|}

Semi-finals

|}

Final

References

Slovenian Football Cup seasons
Cup
Slovenian Cup